Metaeuchromius yusufeliensis is a moth in the family Crambidae. It was described by Matthias Nuss and Wolfgang Speidel in 1999. It is found in Turkey.

References

Crambinae
Moths described in 1999